Megatrends are trends that have an effect on a global scale. Some of the current megatrends are identical with global threats.

Economic implications
Economically, megatrends can be exploited by enterprises to make profit.
BlackRock, PwC, and Ernst & Young e.g., identify at least 7 megatrends:
Technological progress, esp. in the internet domain
Demographic change and social change
Rapid global urbanization
Climate change and resource depletion
Emerging markets
The impact of deepfakes and other synthetic media
Microbiomes and synthetic biology

References

Futures studies
Research